The Brilliance V7 is a mid-size CUV produced by Brilliance Auto under the Zhonghua brand.

Overview

The Brilliance V7 is essentially the 7-seat version of the Brilliance V6 that it was based on. Positioning above the Brilliance V6, the Brilliance V7 was launched during the 2017 Guangzhou Auto Show with prices ranging from 108,700 to 194,700 yuan.

References

External links 

 Brilliance V7 Official page

V7
Mid-size sport utility vehicles
Front-wheel-drive vehicles
Cars introduced in 2018
Crossover sport utility vehicles
Cars of China